Ferdiansyah (born on 24 April 2000) is an Indonesian professional footballer who plays as a midfielder for Liga 1 club Barito Putera.

Club career

Barito Putera
Ferdiansyah made his debut in the Liga 1 for Barito Putera on 22 June 2019, in a 2–1 defeat to Kalteng Putra. He ended the 2019 season with 19 appearances.

Career statistics

Club

Notes

References

External links
 
 Ferdiansyah at Liga Indonesia

2000 births
Living people
Indonesian footballers
People from Jakarta
Association football midfielders
PS Barito Putera players
Liga 1 (Indonesia) players
Sportspeople from Jakarta